Walter "Wally" Scharold is a London, England based composer, guitarist, vocalist, bandleader, producer, games designer, and filmmaker.  Born and raised in Houston, Texas he sang in choirs and musicals from age 10, studied rock, jazz, and classical guitar from age 11, and studied contemporary classical composition from age 17 with Todd Frazier, Michael Remson, Christopher Theofanidis, John Luther Adams, Brenda Hutchinson, Randolph Coleman, Fred Frith  and Alvin Curran.   He is a graduate in Music Composition from Oberlin College and has a Masters in Music Composition from Mills College.  As a performer/arranger/composer he has been an active member of the avant-progressive rock community in Oakland, California.  He led his own ensemble miRthkon, an 'amplified chamber ensemble masquerading as a rock band' -- a six-piece ensemble which performed and recorded his own compositions (as well as others by fellow members and other local composers).  He has also been a member or guest of several other bands including MoeTar, The Fuxedos, Research & Development, Tholus, Midline Errors, Marana Jocund, ThinkTank, My Hero, and Headshear   He is also a composer of works for film, dance, video games, and other media including Guitar Hero: Van Halen, Disney's iOS Rhythm Game Tap Tap Revenge,  Disney's iOS game Cars 2, a score for the documentary "Pup", a commission by the intermedia performance group Double Vision, and recent commissions by San Francisco-based ensemble The Living Earth Show and guitarist Travis Andrews.

Since 2003, Scharold has also worked professionally as a composer, sound designer, audio engineer, guitarist, voiceover artist, and game designer for over one hundred commercial products and titles released by many companies including LeapFrog, Electronic Arts, Activision, Tapulous, Disney, IGT, and as Head of Audio at Play'n GO.

Selected Discography

Bands 
miRthkon
miRthkon (1999, self-released, CD-R)
ruth-bikula phaze-ivy (2001, self-released double CD-R)
The Illusion of Joy (2006, self-released, EP)
Vehicle (2009, altrOck Productions, #ALT-009, CD)
(Format) (2012, altrOck Productions, #ALT-029, DVD)
Snack(s) (2013, altrOck Productions, #ALT-038, CD)
Tholus
"Constant" (2007, Aural Music/Goregorerecords, CD)
Research & Development
"All Things to All People" (2010, Bandcamp, CD/Digital)
My Hero
"Whop! Bam! Boom!" (2003, self-released, EP)
"Untitled" (2005, unreleased, CD)
Headshear
"Headshear" (2006, Big Balloon, CD/Digital)

Performer Only 
Brett Larner / Burkhand Stangl / Taku Sugimoto
"Compositions for Guitars" (2003, A Bruit Secret, CD)
Dave Willey and Friends
"Immeasurable Currents" (2011, AltrOck Productions, CD)

Composer Only 
Oberlin Conservatory Division of Contemporary Music
"Aural Capacity - Student Works" (2001, Oberlin Conservatory of Music, CD)

Production Only 
The Living Earth Show
"High Art" (2013, Innova Records, CD) - Recording Engineer, Mix Engineer, Producer

References 

Living people
Musicians from Oakland, California
21st-century American composers
American male composers
American filmmakers
1978 births
21st-century American male musicians